Andromedans may refer to:
 Andromedan Invaders (Star Fleet Universe)
 Andromedans (extraterrestrial), a name given to what are said to be a group of "ascended" extraterrestrials from the Andromeda Galaxy